Empis tridentata is a species of dance flies in the family Empididae. Trident-shaped gray mark, points forward, on yellowish thorax.

References

Empis
Articles created by Qbugbot
Insects described in 1901